A number of motor vessels have been named Krasnodar, after the city in Russia, including

 , a Soviet cargo ship in service 1946–75. IMO Number 5196438
 , a Liberian tanker built in 2003. IMO Number 9270517
 , a Russian Oscar-class submarine

Ship names